Llynclys) is a small village in Shropshire, England, in the civil parish of Llanyblodwel. It lies north of Pant at the crossroads of the A483 and B4396, where there are several houses and a pub, the White Lion.

Etymology
The name Llynclys is based on the Welsh word for lake, and Llynclys Pool still lies near to the village.

Countryside
Much of the area around Llynclys Hill to the west is common land; there are a number of cottages and smallholdings probably built by workers in the area's lead mines and limestone quarries. Llynclys Common, from which there are fine views, is home to eight varieties of orchid and the brown argus butterfly.

Railways
The Cambrian Heritage Railways are now re-building sections of the line as a heritage railway.  railway station is in operation, whilst the original  station remains unused of 2010.

Plane Crash
On the 30 October 1941 a Royal Air Force, Handley Page Hampden Mk I (P1294) crashed near the White Lion pub while on a training flight in bad weather, all four crew died

References

External links

Villages in Shropshire
Aviation accidents and incidents locations in England